Rouge (Jyutping: Jin1zi1 kau3) is a 1987 Hong Kong supernatural romantic-drama film, directed by Stanley Kwan and starring Anita Mui and Leslie Cheung. The film is the adaptation of a novel with the same title by Lilian Lee.

Plot
In 1987 Hong Kong, newspaperman Yuen and his girlfriend, Chor are drawn into a doomed 1930s romance when the ghost of courtesan Fleur publishes an advertisement in the newspapers, looking for her lost lover Chan Chen-Pang. She has waited in the afterlife for Chan for 53 years and believes he has become lost.

Chan was the playboy son of a wealthy family, but longed to be an actor, who met and fell in love with talented, beautiful Fleur in one of Hong Kong's teahouses. Realising their romance would never be accepted, the couple committed suicide by opium overdose in order to be together in the afterlife. 

Pragmatic Yuen and Chor become dazzled by the romance of Fleur's story and the ghost's glamorous beauty, but as their search for Chan reveals the truth - that Chan did not die with Fleur, frittered away his inheritance and now lives impoverished as a movie extra - they see the value of their own, honest relationship.

The title refers to a rouge case Chan gave to Fleur, which she returns to the now-elderly, guilt-wracked man, before leaving the living world.

Cast
 Anita Mui as Fleur
 Leslie Cheung as Chan Chen-Pang 
 Alex Man as Yuen 
 Irene Wan as Shu-Hsien
 Emily Chu as Ah Chor 
 Kara Hui as Ghost 
 Lau Kar-wing as Movie Director 
 Patrick Tse as Brothel Patron
 Ruby Wong
 Jackie Chan Stunt Team – extra/stunts

Release 
The film received a Region 1 Criterion Collection home video release in 2022.

Awards

References

External links 
 
 
 HK cinemagic entry

1988 films
1988 romantic drama films
1980s fantasy drama films
Hong Kong romantic drama films
Hong Kong fantasy drama films
1980s Cantonese-language films
Hong Kong romantic fantasy films
Hong Kong ghost films
Films about prostitution in Hong Kong
Films set in 1934
Films set in 1987
Best Film HKFA
Films directed by Stanley Kwan
Films about opium
1980s Hong Kong films